Joyce "Fenderella" Irby (born July, 1956, Orlando, FL - according to her 2022 memoir, "Id Still Say Yes") is an American singer, songwriter, bass guitarist and producer. She was the co-lead vocalist of the all-female band Klymaxx.
Irby has also worked with artists such as Lloyd, Troop, Sammie, The SOS Band and Shalamar.

Career
In her teenage years, she used to stand outside concert arenas in the South with her bass around her neck, playing on loading ramps. There she was first noticed by George Clinton. He used to make her sit with him after concerts, encouraging her by listening to her play.

George Clinton/P-Funk Collective 

She originally signed on with George Clinton's P-Funk Collective as "Fenderella". While she never featured on any Funkadelic/George Clinton albums, she considers him her lifetime friend and mentor.

Klymaxx 

Dick Griffey, president of Solar Records, saw Irby perform on a loading ramp and asked Leon Sylvers, the producer, if he could contact her. They were in search of a female bass player for their new group Klymaxx.

Jimmy Jam heard her singing while he was playing piano in the studio with the girls which led her to the opportunity to lead Klymaxx songs. She was the lead singer on 3 of Klymaxx’s 4 biggest records, including their biggest hit “I Miss You.” She also penned and recorded the group’s first hit, “The Men All Pause."

Solo Work 

In 1989, she scored a solo deal with Motown Records and had 3 charted Billboard singles, most notable "Mr. DJ" with Doug E. Fresh which peaked at #2.

In 2012, Irby scored a top 5 Billboard hit as a co-writer with the Fat Joe/Chris Brown song, "Another Round".

Diva One Productions 

Irby relocated from Los Angeles to Atlanta in the mid 1980s and began to attempt the rise of Atlanta as an urban music center by soliciting major record labels and producers Jimmy Jam and Terry Lewis, and L.A. Reid & Babyface to form regional offices in the area.

There, she founded Diva One Productions, a production and publishing company. Her greatest impact in this respect, may have been the result of her signing a 16 year-old Dallas Austin as a songwriter and producer in 1988. Dallas produced the first TLC and Boyz II Men projects while still signed to Irby's company.

She then signed child star Sammie Bush, to a deal with Dallas and Capitol Records launching his career when he was 12 years old. 

Irby also signed Lloyd (The Inc) as an 11-year-old and developed and guided his career through four major record deals (Warner, DreamWorks, Magic Johnson Music/MCA, The Inc/Universal). 

Irby gave multi platinum writer/producer Jasper Cameron his first songwriting deal.

Honors and awards 
Irby won an ASCAP songwriter award in 2012 for co-penning one of the most played Urban records in the US, a top 5 single, “Another Round”, by Fat Joe, Chris Brown, & Mary J Blige.

Personal life
An avid animal lover, Irby started her own charity "Jams For Animals", to raise consciousness and promote kindness to animals through music and video.

References 

Women bass guitarists
Living people
1954 births
People from Los Angeles
People from Fort Bragg, North Carolina
20th-century African-American women singers
American women singers
20th-century American bass guitarists
People from Eatonville, Florida
20th-century American women musicians
African-American guitarists
21st-century African-American people
21st-century African-American women